St Hilda's College is a residence hall of the University of Trinity College, itself a federated college of the University of Toronto in Toronto, Ontario.  Although all students registered at Trinity College are considered students of St Hilda's College, it is not an independent body and today serves only an administrative function. St Hilda's College was named after St Hilda of Whitby.

History

The University of Trinity College admitted its first female student in 1884.  In 1888, it was decided that a distinct college was required for Trinity's women students.  St Hilda's College was initially opened in a building on Euclid Avenue in Toronto, with two resident students.  The college was moved to a building on Shaw Street in 1889, then to a set of two larger houses on the same street in 1892, and in 1903 to a larger, purpose-built building on the main Trinity College grounds.

In 1925, when Trinity College moved from its original location on Queen Street to the main University of Toronto campus, St Hilda's College was initially moved to 99 St. George Street. The final move took place in 1938, when the current St Hilda's building on Devonshire Place was opened. The former St Hilda's College building at Trinity Bellwoods Park (designed by Eden Smith and opened in 1899) is now called John Gibson House and functions as a residence for seniors.

In 2005, the administration of Trinity College elected to end the practice of same-sex residency. As a result, St Hilda's College now houses both men and women.

References

Colleges of the University of Toronto
University of Toronto buildings